was a Japanese monk credited with playing an influential role in the founding of Buddhism in Japan.

In C.E. 653, the original Dōshō travelled to China, studying under the Buddhist monk Xuanzang, whose travels to India were immortalized in the book Journey to the West. His studies centered on Xuanzang's Weishi, Chinese variant of Indian Yogācāra, but he was also exposed to Chinese Chán while there, which would later lead to his influence on the founding of Japanese Zen Buddhism. In China, the school is known as Wéishí-zōng ("Consciousness Only" school), or Fǎxiàng-zōng ("Dharma Characteristics" school).

After returning from China, Dōshō became a priest at Gangō-ji, one of the great temples, the Nanto Shichi Daiji, in Nara, Japan. His teachings were based on the consciousness-only philosophy taught by Xuanzang, which in Japanese he called Hossō. It was at Gangō-ji that later he founded Japan's first meditation hall.

There is a legend about his return from China that says Xuanzang had given him a magical kettle. Whenever any medicine was prepared in the kettle, it could cure any illness. The monk travelling with Dōshō was supposedly cured before embarking on the sea trip back to Japan. However, while at sea a great storm came upon them. A diviner on board said that the sea god wanted the kettle. Dōshō at first resisted, but eventually gave in, and the storm immediately abated.

References

Bibliography
 
 

629 births
700 deaths
Japanese Buddhist clergy
Asuka period Buddhist clergy